"Antisocial" is a song by English singer-songwriter Ed Sheeran and American rapper and singer Travis Scott. It was released on 12 July 2019 through Asylum and Atlantic Records, along with "South of the Border", as the sixth and seventh singles respectively from Sheeran's compilation album, No.6 Collaborations Project (2019).

Promotion
"Antisocial" was announced to be the seventh track from No.6 Collaborations Project. On 11 July 2019, Sheeran announced that the song as the next single from the album and that its music video would be released on 12 July.

Music video
The music video for the song was released on 12 July 2019, along with the lyric video. The video was directed by Dave Meyers and written by Matt Walton. In the video Sheeran and Scott played a number of different characters in different scenes that referenced films such as Kill Bill, The Mask, The Birds, The Martian, Edward Scissorhands, and Pulp Fiction.

Track listing

Credits and personnel 
Credits adapted from Tidal.
 Ed Sheeran – vocals, songwriter
 Travis Scott – vocals, songwriter, engineer
 Grandmaster Flash – songwriter
 Fred Gibson – backing vocals, producer, songwriter, programmer, engineer, bass, drums, guitar, keyboards
 Alex Gibson – additional production
 DJ Riggins – engineer
 Jacob Richards – engineer
 Mike Seaberg – engineer
 Tre Nagella – engineer
 Jaycen Joshua – mixer
 Stuart Hawkes – masterer

Charts

Certifications

Release history

References

External links
 

2019 songs
2019 singles
Ed Sheeran songs
Asylum Records singles
Atlantic Records singles
Music videos directed by Dave Meyers (director)
Song recordings produced by Fred Again
Songs written by Ed Sheeran
Songs written by Fred Again
Songs written by Travis Scott
Travis Scott songs